Thodari is a 2016 Indian Tamil-language action-romance film co produced, written and directed by Prabhu Solomon. It stars Dhanush and Keerthy Suresh, with D. Imman composing the film's music. Set on an express train, Thodari follows a pantry worker who tries to save the passengers and his girlfriend from hijackers and a politician's bodyguard amid a runaway train incident.

Thodari was released theatrically on 22 September 2016. It was later dubbed into Hindi as Express Khiladi in 2018.

Plot
In New Delhi Railway Station, Poochiyappan is a railway catering company server who is on duty on the New Delhi-Chennai Express. He is working with his team member and best friend Vairam under his supervisor Chandrakanth.

During the journey, he meets Saroja and falls in love with her at first sight. She is the make-up artist of the actress Srisha, and she wants to become a successful singer. Poochi tells Vairam about Saroja, who promises to help him woo her. Poochi devises a plan, and makes her talk on the phone to  the renowned Tamil poet Vairamuthu, who is actually Vairam. However, he soon realises that Saroja is not good at singing though continuing to support her. Saroja remains close to Poochi as she wants to enter the singing industry without knowing the true fact.

The train stops at Jhansi where Central Minister Rangarajan boards the train along with his two bodyguards. One of them, Nandhakumar, doesn't get along with Poochi and Saroja. He also gets humiliated by the minister in front of Poochi, and he wants to take revenge. Poochi asks him to apologize to Saroja for hitting her earlier, to which he agrees in order to get his lost gun back. He soon realises that the gun is with the minister and not with Poochi and Saroja. He vows to murder them. Meanwhile, at Nagpur Junction, robbers board the train without anyone's knowledge, as the driver celebrates his retirement.

The next morning, Srisha's mother spots Saroja with Poochi and asks him to call singer Vairamuthu in front of them, which leads to the truth. Saroja, now devastated, asks him never to show his face again. When he tries to apologize, he is confronted by Nandhakumar, who locks him in a room. The train stops after hitting some wild bulls, which was blamed upon the assistant driver, who failed to alert the driver. Nandhakumar tries to attack Saroja, but she escapes. Due to a fight between the guard of the train and the assistant driver, a green flag was waved. The driver notices and, thinking that the assistant driver has fully checked the brakes' connection, he starts the train. As the train starts accelerating, Saroja is unable to board the passenger compartment in the moving train, so she boards the engine. At the same time, the guard and the assistant driver fall off the train, leaving them behind. A message is passed on to the railway administrator that the guard is not on the train. However, the driver, numb from thinking of the incident, does not hear it. After a few moments, the driver dies of a heart attack, and while falling, pushes the controls forward, making the train speed up, which is watched by Saroja, much to her horror. The train starts to skip stations, much to the alarm of the station masters and the railway administrator. At the same time, the burglars attack the passengers, and order  the train not to stop. The passengers get terrified due to the high speed. Poochi then overpowers Nandhakumar and attempts to save Saroja. He kills all the burglars and gives Saroja a walkie talkie for communication. Nandhakumar tries to kill Poochi but is himself killed by the edge of an oncoming rail tunnel.

News spreads that the train driver is dead, and the train is hijacked. Many mistakes the robbers for terrorists and Saroja as their leader. Officers from the police and railway administration are given the responsibility to bring down the train. When they realise that the train is not hijacked, but out of control, they take help from Poochi and Saroja to stop the train by guiding Saroja on how to turn on the emergency brake. However, due to a short circuit earlier, the brakes do not work. They devise a plan to detach the engine from the passenger compartment. Poochi is successful after a long attempt in doing so, and he jumps to the locomotive to save Saroja. Saroja realises her love for Poochi. At Chennai Central railway station, the whole station is evacuated as the oncoming train approaches. The locomotive crashes into the station, and both Poochi and Saroja are injured, but alive. The detached passenger compartments arrive in Chennai, safe with passengers unscathed. They are interviewed by the media, and Poochi is named a national hero.

Cast

Dhanush as Poochiyappan "Poochi"
Keerthy Suresh as Saroja
Radha Ravi as Rangarajan
Karunakaran as Vairam
Thambi Ramaiah as Chandrakanth
Swarupu alias Karthic Shankar as Saroja's Murai Maman
Ganesh Venkatraman as Sultan IPS, DIG, Railway Protection Force
Pooja Jhaveri as actress Srisha
Harish Uthaman as Nandhakumar
Chinni Jayanth as Jack
Imman Annachi as Stephen, Train Ticket Examiner
Ashvin Raja as Johnson
G. Gnanasambandam as Sadhasivam
Pattimandram Raja as Tamilselvan
Bose Venkat as Assistant Loco Pilot
Anu Mohan as Pughazhmannan
R. V. Udayakumar as Devaraj
A. Venkatesh as Thangapandian
Prem as Aravind
Badava Gopi as Unmai TV host
Darbuka Siva as Rajapandi
Maya Krishnan as IBC newsreader
Nassar
 Florent Pereira
Bharathi Kannan
Dhalapathy
 Supergood Subramani

Production
In early 2015, Prabhu Solomon approached Dhanush to play the lead role in his next film and by February 2015, the director had started pre-production work with a recce in North India. Keerthy Suresh was signed to play the leading female role.

Thodari is the first Indian film that was shot entirely on a train. The film's shoot took place predominantly on the Duronto Express, and the film features the lead pair travelling from Delhi to Chennai. Hence, initially, a grand train set was put up at Binny Mills, Chennai during July 2015 for the film's initial schedule. Production continued for sixty days straight, with the makers alternating between shooting the film in sets and on a live train. Shoot progressed through the middle of 2015, with scenes also filmed in Goa and Hyderabad. In October 2015, a schedule was shot in Orissa, after which production was completed for scenes featuring Dhanush. Prabhu Solomon continued to shoot further scenes featuring parallel stories throughout late 2015 and early 2016, with Ganesh Venkatraman filming scenes during January 2016.

Release 
This Film has been sold by Jaya TV.

Reception 
The film received mixed reviews from critics and audience.

Box office

Soundtrack

The soundtrack of the film is composed by D. Imman. The last time he scored music for a film starring Dhanush was in 2006 for Thiruvilaiyaadal Aarambam and this is the sixth time Prabhu Solomon is collaborating with Imman.

References

External links
 
 

2010s Tamil-language films
2016 films
2016 action thriller films
2016 romance films
Films scored by D. Imman
Films set on trains
Films about terrorism in India
Indian romantic action films
Indian action thriller films
Films shot in Hyderabad, India
Films shot in Goa
Films directed by Prabhu Solomon